Sybra bifuscoplagiata is a species of beetle in the family Cerambycidae. It was described by Breuning in 1940. It is known from Borneo and Java.

References

bifuscoplagiata
Beetles described in 1940